Erxleben may refer to:

placenames:
 Erxleben, Stendal, part of the town Osterburg in the district of Stendal in Saxony-Anhalt, Germany
 Erxleben, Börde, a municipality in the district of Börde in Saxony-Anhalt, Germany
people:
 Dorothea Erxleben, (1715–1762), the first female medical doctor in Germany 
 Heather Erxleben, (b. 1966), former Canadian Forces soldier who was the first female to graduate from a Regular Force infantry trades training course
 Johann Christian Polycarp Erxleben (1744–1777), German naturalist and professor of physics and veterinary medicine
 Johannes Erxleben (1893–1972), German professional soldier and Wehrmacht general in World War II
 Michael Erxleben, German violinist, conductor and music professor
 Russell Erxleben (b. 1957),  former American football player and currency investor convicted of securities fraud in 1999
others:
 A meteorite fall that occurred on 15 Apr 1812 near Erxleben, Saxony-Anhalt
 A crater on the planet Venus, named after Dorothea Erxleben (see List of craters on Venus)